Guadua paraguayana is a species of clumping bamboo found in northern Argentina, Bolivia, Brazil, Paraguay and Venezuela.

This bamboo is used for posts, fences, flooring and decorative work.

References

paraguayana
Grasses of South America
Flora of Paraguay
Grasses of Argentina
Grasses of Brazil